Three ships of the United States Navy have been named USS Duncan, in honor of  Master Commandant Silas Duncan. 

  was a  launched in 1913.
  was a  launched in February 1942 and sunk at the Battle of Cape Esperance in October 1942.
   was a  launched in 1944.

A fourth ship named has been named USS Duncan, in honor of Vice Admiral Donald B. Duncan (1896–1975).

  was an  commissioned in 1980 and decommissioned in 1994

See also 
 

United States Navy ship names

ja:ダンカン (駆逐艦)